Mukunda Michael Dewil is a South African screenwriter and director working in Hollywood.  He wrote and directed Retribution, Vehicle 19 (starring Paul Walker)  and The Immaculate Room (Emile Hirsch, Kate Bosworth, Ashley Greene).

He was a monk. Dewil spent several years in India.

References

External links
 

South African film directors
Living people
Year of birth missing (living people)